The 1893 Trinity Blue and White football team was an American football team that represented Trinity College (later renamed Duke University) as an independent during the 1893 college football season. The team compiled a 3–1 record. The team had no coach; Alphonso Avery, Jr. was the team captain.

Schedule

References

Trinity
Duke Blue Devils football seasons
Trinity Blue and White football